The 1988 World Junior Championships in Athletics was the 1988 edition of the World Junior Championships in Athletics, held in Sudbury, Ontario, Canada from July 27 to July 31, 1988.

Planning
The city's bid to host the games was accepted in 1986, winning over Cali, Colombia. In addition to the International Association of Athletics Federations's concerns about the political instability of Colombia at the time, Sudbury had recently established a strong reputation in sporting circles due to its hosting of the 1980 Pan American Junior Athletics Championships, as well as Alex Baumann's world record performance in swimming at the 1984 Summer Olympics.

Despite this, IAAF president Primo Nebiolo personally opposed the selection, arguing that the city was not large or world-famous enough to be an appropriate host city for the event. Over the next two years, Nebiolo lobbied several times to have the games pulled from the city, in turn causing difficulties for the city in securing sufficient funding from corporate and government sponsors. As late as ten days before the event was to begin, the event still faced a significant budget gap in its broadcasting contracts, with Nebiolo again threatening to pull the games from the city before a last-minute donation from the Canadian Track and Field Association covered the shortfall.

Once the games started, however, Nebiolo was more positive, stating that the games benefited from being held in a smaller centre that was able to provide an athlete-centred experience and had the community spirit to draw on a huge base of volunteers.

The city's Northern Lights Festival Boréal was held concurrently to serve as the championships' cultural festival. CBC Television and MCTV acted as the host broadcasters.

Overall, the games contributed approximately $8 million to the city's local economy.

Results

Men

Women

Medal table

Participation
According to an unofficial count through an unofficial result list, 1024 athletes from 123 countries participated in the event.  This is in agreement with the official numbers as published.

See also
1988 in athletics (track and field)

References

External links
 Official results
Medalists at GBRathletics.com
Results

 
World Athletics U20 Championships
World Junior Championships
J
World Junior Championships in Athletics
International track and field competitions hosted by Canada
World Junior Championships in Athletics
July 1988 sports events in Canada